The 2025 Bangsamoro Parliament election is scheduled to take place in the Bangsamoro Autonomous Region in Muslim Mindanao (BARMM) on May 12 under the Bangsamoro Organic Law, the charter of the autonomous region of the Philippines.

This election will be the first regular election for the Bangsamoro Parliament and was scheduled to be held in parallel with the 2022 Philippine general election. Elected officials would assumed office on June 30, 2025. They would succeed the interim Bangsamoro Transition Authority Parliament.

The postponement of the elections from 2022 to 2025, was caused by the COVID-19 pandemic and consequentially the absence of a Bangsamoro Electoral Code. The interim regional government and advocacy groups in Mindanao successfully campaigned to move the date of the elections.

Background

Interim parliament
When Bangsamoro was formed in 2019, the Bangsamoro Transition Authority served as an interim government of the autonomous region, and also acted as its interim parliament. The interim government is not officially divided through political party affiliation but is instead divided into two groups according to the nominating entity; the majority are nominees of the Moro Islamic Liberation Front, while the rest are nominees of the Philippine national government.

Under the law which postponed the elections to 2025, the President of the Philippines may appoint a new set of members for the interim parliament whose term will run until June 30, 2025.

Postponement
Originally scheduled to be held on May 9, 2022, the Bangsamoro Parliament elections was postponed. The impact of the COVID-19 pandemic in the region was cited as justification, which led to the non-passage of a Bangsamoro Electoral Code. The electoral code would be the regional legislation that would define the parliamentary districts for the purpose of the regional elections. The electoral code would be legislated using data from the 2020 census which was likewise affected by the pandemic. In order for the elections to be postponed, the Bangsamoro Organic Law needs to be amended.

The Bangsamoro interim government and some advocacy groups in Mindanao campaigned for the postponement of the polls. Interim Chief Minister Murad Ebrahim reasoned that three years is not enough to restructure the region's government, and that the COVID-19 pandemic and delays on the release of the region's budget caused the delay in the transition process. The postponement also received opposition. Kusug Tausug in the House of Representatives believed that postponing the elections tantamount to justifying the interim Bangsamoro government's performance which it found inadequate. Sulu Governor Abdusakur Tan also opposed the extension since he wanted elected officials to lead the region by 2022.

In the Congress, there was a debate if it would be necessary to hold a plebiscite for the potential postponement of the Bangsamoro elections. The National Citizens' Movement for Free Elections, amid talks on the possible postponement of the elections, wanted the polls to be "desynchronized" or be held in a different date from the national elections since a new electoral system would be used for the regional elections.

The Senate approved on final reading Senate Bill No. 2214 on September 6, 2021, proposing the postponement of elections to 2025. A counterpart bill in the House of Representatives was approved on September 15. As the two bills were different, it had to be reconciled in a conference committee before being submitted for the president's signature for it to become law, and for it to actually postpone the election. While both bills gave the president of the Philippines the power to appoint the members for the 2019–2022 term, the House bill gave the incumbent president Rodrigo Duterte that power, while the Senate bill gave the winner of the 2022 presidential election that power. In late September, both chambers ratified the conference committee's version of the bill, giving the winning president in the 2022 election the power to appoint the members of the next transitional parliament.

President Rodrigo Duterte signed into law on October 28 the bill postponing the elections to 2025. However Duterte's successor could still change the parliament's composition once they assume office.

Electoral system

A total of 80 seats will be contested in the 2025 Bangsamoro elections. The final composition of the parliament after the elections should satisfy the following:

 One half (40 seats) shall be representatives of political parties elected through a system of proportional representation.
 Not more than 40 percent (32 seats) of the members of the parliament shall be elected from single member districts.
 Reserved seats and sectoral representatives shall constitute at least 10 percent, which in any case should be no less than 8 seats.

The Bangsamoro parliamentary districts are yet to be constituted. The parliamentary districts will exist independently from the congressional districts used to determine representation in the national House of Representatives.

The following is the distribution for the sectoral representatives seats:

Non-Moro Indigenous Peoples (NMIP) – 2 seats
Settler Communities – 2 seats
Women – 1 seat
Youth – 1 seat
Traditional leaders – 1 seat
Ulama – 1 seat

The NMIPs, Traditional leaders, and Ulama representatives shall be elected in their own convention/assembly separate from the parliamentary elections. The names of the elected representatives should be submitted to the Commission on Elections seven days prior to the parliamentary elections and would be proclaimed simultaneously with the rest of the elected members of parliament.

Parties
When the United Bangsamoro Justice Party (UBJP) was queried in May 2021 if they would participate in the not-yet-postponed Bangsamoro elections, they said that they were "ready" but expressed preference "there would be no election yet", so that they would keep focused on "the delivery of basic services" to residents of Bangsamoro. The UBJP is an affiliate of the Moro Islamic Liberation Front, whose nominees form the majority of the Bangsamoro Transition Authority Parliament.

Sectoral representatives

Non-Moro Indigenous Peoples

Traditional leaders

The traditional leaders sector represent the royal sultanates in Bangsamoro.

Sulu Sultanate
Maguindanao Sultanate
Kabuntalan Sultanate
Buayan Sultanate
Royal Houses of Ranao
Royal Houses Of Iranun

Ulama

References

External links
BARMM extension bill tracker from the Philippine Center for Investigative Journalism

Bangsamoro Parliament election
Elections postponed due to the COVID-19 pandemic